The 1921–22 Northern Rugby Football Union season was the 27th season of rugby league football.

Season summary
Featherstone Rovers joined the competition this season.

In November, winger Harold Buck became rugby league's first £1,000 transfer when he moved from Hunslet to Leeds.

Oldham had ended the regular season as the league leaders.

Wigan won their second ever Championship this season when they defeated Oldham 13-2 in the play-off final.

The 1921–22 Kangaroo tour of Great Britain also took place during the season, with many of the clubs playing games against the visiting Australasian team.

Oldham won the Lancashire League, and Huddersfield won the Yorkshire League. Warrington beat Oldham 7–5 to win the Lancashire Cup, and Leeds beat Dewsbury 11–3 to win the Yorkshire County Cup.

Championship

Championship play-off

Challenge Cup

The final saw Rochdale Hornets's 10-9 victory over Hull F.C. in the 1921–22 Challenge Cup Final at Headingley, Leeds on Saturday 6 May 1922, in front of a crowd of 32,596. This was Rochdale's first Challenge Cup Final win in their first, and as of 2017 their only, Challenge Cup Final appearance.

Rochdale Hornets: 10

Rochdale Hornets Tries: Tommy Fitton 2

Rochdale Hornets Goals: Dicky Paddon 2

Hull: 9

Hull Tries: Jimmy Kennedy, Billy Batten, Bob Taylor

Half-time: 6-7

Attendance: 34,827 (at Headingley, Leeds)

Rochdale Hornets: Frank Prescott, Tommy Fitton, Fred Wild, Teddy McLoughlin, Joe Corsi, J. Eaton, J. Keynon, Thomas Harris, Jack Bennett, Dickie Paddon, Tommy Woods, Dai Edwards, Louis Corsi

Hull: J. Holdsworth, Billy Stone (c), Jimmy Kennedy, Billy Batten, Emlyn Gwynne, Eddie Caswell, W. J. Charles, Jack Beasty, George Oliver, J. E. Wyburn, Edgar Morgan, Bob Taylor, H. Garratt

Sources
1921-22 Rugby Football League season at wigan.rlfans.com
The Challenge Cup at The Rugby Football League website

References

1921 in English rugby league
1922 in English rugby league
Northern Rugby Football Union seasons